Cartomothrips is a genus of thrips in the family Phlaeothripidae.

Species
 Cartomothrips abrsi
 Cartomothrips browni
 Cartomothrips laughlini
 Cartomothrips manukae
 Cartomothrips neboissi
 Cartomothrips tofti

References

Phlaeothripidae
Thrips
Thrips genera